The Falls is a 2001 crime novel by Ian Rankin. It is the twelfth of the Inspector Rebus novels.

Plot summary
A student vanishes in Edinburgh and her wealthy family of bankers ensures Lothian and Borders Police is under pressure to find her. The novel presents in detail a difficult case, where the newly appointed (and first female) Chief Super, Gill Templer, is trying to please her superiors and manipulate her CID officers. In the course of the novel, DC Siobhan Clarke must decide whether to take a plum position offered her by DCS Templer or stick with investigation in the style of John Rebus.
   
Two sets of clues, one nineteenth-century and one twenty-first-century, appear. A carved wooden doll in a coffin found near the missing woman's East Lothian home leads Rebus to the National Museum of Scotland's collection of dolls in coffins found on Arthur's Seat in 1836, after the famous Burke and Hare murders in Edinburgh. Rebus also wanders into the Surgeons' Hall, where he meets several forensic pathologists of his acquaintance and sees the Burke and Hare exhibit there. A museum curator, Jean Burchill, alerts him to what might be a more recent serial killer marking his exploits with such coffins. While Rebus pursues these historical angles in libraries, police archives, and museums, DC Siobhan Clarke interacts with an electronic trail via computer and mobile phone. Clarke discovers that the woman who disappeared had been playing an Internet role-playing game, and tackles the virtual Quizmaster; she risks the same fate as the missing girl.

TV Adaptation
The Falls was the first episode in the second Rebus television series, starring Ken Stott, airing in 2006. This version is substantially changed from the novel and somewhat resembles the plot of the film Chinatown.

References

2001 British novels
Inspector Rebus novels
Novels set in Edinburgh
Orion Books books